Fernand Palma d'Artois, O.C.D. (1623–1701) was a Roman Catholic prelate who served as Vicar Apostolic of Great Mogul (1696–1701) and Titular Archbishop of Ancyra (1696–1701).

Biography
Fernand Palma d'Artois was born on 2 January 1623 in Naples, Italy and ordained a priest in the Order of Discalced Carmelites.
In September 1696, he was appointed during the papacy of Pope Innocent XII as Titular Archbishop of Ancyra.
On 16 September 1696, he was consecrated bishop by Domenico Belisario de Bellis, Bishop of Molfetta, with serving as co-consecrators. 
On 20 September 1696, he was appointed during the papacy of Pope Innocent XII as Vicar Apostolic of Great Mogul.
He served as Vicar Apostolic of Great Mogul until his death on 3 January 1701.

References

External links and additional sources
 (for Chronology of Bishops) 
 (for Chronology of Bishops)  

17th-century Roman Catholic titular bishops
Bishops appointed by Pope Innocent XII
1623 births
1701 deaths
Discalced Carmelites